Konstantin Nahk (born Konstantin Kolbassenko; 10 February 1975) is a retired Estonian professional footballer. He played as a central midfielder and was known for his set-piece ability. He had a spell abroad in the Veikkausliiga with FC Jokerit.

Honours

Individual
 Meistriliiga Footballer of the Season: 2009

External links
 
 
 

1975 births
Living people
Footballers from Tallinn
Estonian people of Russian descent
Estonian footballers
Estonian expatriate footballers
Expatriate footballers in Belarus
Expatriate footballers in Finland
Meistriliiga players
Veikkausliiga players
KSK Vigri Tallinn players
FCI Levadia Tallinn players
FC Torpedo Minsk players
Viljandi JK Tulevik players
FC Jokerit players
FCI Tallinn players
Association football midfielders